Peeter Jakobson (27 December 1854 – 23 July 1899) was an Estonian writer. Jakobson wrote post-romantic poetry, short stories and memoirs. He also translated his poems into German.

He born in Rakvere. From 1877 to 1878, he participated on Russo-Turkish War.

He died in Väike-Maarja, and he is buried at Väike-Maarja Cemetery.

Works
 poetry collection "Õilme nupukesed" (1881)
 poetry collection"Luuletused" I–II (1884–1885)
 theatre piece "Koit ja Hämarik" (1884)
 theatre piece"Udumäe kuningas ehk kroonitud voorus" (1888)
 memories "Minu sõjamälestused" (1901)

References

1854 births
1899 deaths
Estonian male poets
19th-century Estonian poets
Estonian male short story writers
Estonian translators
People from Rakvere